Saint James East Central is a parliamentary constituency represented in the House of Representatives of the Jamaican Parliament. It elects one Member of Parliament by the first past the post system of election. The constituency was first contested in the 1976 general election. The current MP is the Hon. Edmund Bartlett of the Jamaica Labour Party who has been in office since 2002.

Boundaries 

The constituency covers the Rose Hall, Somerton and Spring Mount electoral divisions in St. James.

Demographics

According to the Jamaica Population Census of 2011, the number of persons living in the constituency was 36,689, while the number of registered voters was 24,826. As of the 2020 general election, the number of registered electors in the constituency was 29,852. This represents a 5.9% increase over the 28,178 voters registered for the 2016 general election.

Members of Parliament

Elections

Elections from 2000 to Present

Elections from 1980 to 1999

Elections from 1976 to 1979

See also
 Politics of Jamaica
 Elections in Jamaica

References

Parliamentary constituencies of Jamaica